Falsettos is an American musical about homosexuality, Jewish nationality, and the AIDS epidemic in America during the 1970's and 1980's, and how it affects a gay man and his family. 

Falsettos was written and composed by William Finn, with direction by James Lapine.   Opening on Broadway in April 1992, the musical had a successful run.  Falsettos was revived on Broadway in 2016. Falsettos received seven Tony Award nominations, and won Best Book of a Musical and Best Original Score. 

Plays and musicals with gay characters had been historically rejected on Broadway out of fear that audiences would reject gay themes.  Falsettos portrayed the gay characters as normal, everyday people. Commentators have described the musical as a catalyst in changing Broadway norms and public opinion. Because of Falsettos success during its original release, Lapine decided to create a sequel to the original release.

1992 release 
Falsettos stated as two one-act musicals written by Finn. The first musical, March of the Falsettos, was released in 1981. The second musical, Falsettoland, was released in 1990. In 1992, Finn decided to combine the two musicals into a two-act musical.

Falsettos is set in New York City during the late 1970's to 1980's. The main character is Marvin, married to Trina with a young son Jason. Marvin soon reveals that he gay and leaves Trina for Whizzer, another gay man. Trina starts an affair with Mendel, the family therapist. Marvin is still trying to keep ties with his wife and son. When Whizzer is diagnosed with AIDS, the family unites around him.

2016 revival 
Falsettos reopened on Broadway on October 27, 2016.  Although the impact of HIV/AIDs on the gay community had evolved with new medical treatments, the musical still addresses all the same elements of the first with little to no departure of the original storyline and plot. 

The Falsettos revival received five Tony Award nominations. Levin again directed the musical with Finn as conductor. The revival ran as a limited three-month engagement.

Lapine was enticed by the idea of a group who knew nothing of the events in United States history that were spurred by the AIDS crisis. This was shown through the fact that Lapine cast a 12-year-old actor to play the main character's son and had to explain the events of the AIDS epidemic to the actor in the show who knew next to nothing of them.  This rendition of the show received a pro shot recording and is viewable on Amazon Prime Video and Broadway HD.

Influence of Falsettos 
Falsettos portrayed gay people as actual, fully-developed characters instead of caricatures. Religion was emphasized as well in the musical as the Jewish religion and its customs are repeatedly shown and explained by the characters. Falsettos also highlights the relationship of father and son as Marvin and Jason fight to maintain their previous relationship. 

It is during the course of Falsettos that the audience witnesses Jason comes to terms with his father's sexuality and eventually accept his him for who he is and who he is becoming. In addition to Jason accepting his father's sexuality, there are many other characters that begin to understand and love themselves despite their sexuality. These characters begin to understand that they do not need to be ashamed or sorry for showing who they are. They realize that they are entitled to live a full happy life, just as their heterosexual neighbors were doing. Falsettos  begins to show the rise of the new generation of gay population.

Falsettos and AIDS 
Falsettos elaborates on the fact that the main cause of the fear behind the virus was simply nobody knew what it was. Mass groups of people suddenly began to get the virus and die from it, yet no one was sure how to cure it. The show never mentions AIDS by name, however, it does describe the virus with titles such as "the thing that kills". The mystery and the fear that it caused was an element Lapine and William wanted to very thoroughly emphasize and convey to the audience. 

The topic of AIDS and disease as a theme is avoided entirely in the first act of the musical. Additionally, a character in the second act, known as one of the “Lesbians Next Door”, is a doctor who is not referenced at all in the first act. All characters in the second act also express confusion and misplaced hope in the recovery of Whizzer,  though they eventually come to terms with the severity of the disease and the time they have left with him.

Because Falsettos was revived after originally being released on Broadway, the director and the actors in the musical were tasked with teaching a new generation about the AIDS epidemic and just how lethal it actually was. When the musical originally released, the generation that tended to attend Broadway shows were those who had not witnessed the chaos of the AIDS epidemic at an age where they could remember or comprehend it. In order to create the emotions the people felt as this virus swept across the world, the characters conveyed feelings felt by those suffering from the epidemic at the time to introduce the acute fear that was felt by many gay and heterosexual people during the height of the epidemic. It establishes, to the audience, the lack of information that people had during the outbreak and the most lethal parts of the epidemic.

References

HIV/AIDS in theatre